Balderton is a village in Cheshire, England.

Nearby is Eaton Hall from where the one of the first 15-inch gauge railways ran to the goods yard of the GWR railway station. Both of these have closed.

Villages in Cheshire